Kreisel (German for gyro) is the name of a turn found on some bobsleigh, luge, and skeleton tracks around the world. It is a single continuous curve which turns far enough around that the track must go under itself on the exit of the curve.

There are Kreisels on the tracks shown below:

Note: Oberhof is not used for bobsleigh four-man.

See also 
Bobsled
Luge
Skeleton

References
International Bobsled and Tobogganing Federation (FIBT) Official site
International Luge Federation (FIL) Official site

Bobsleigh
Luge
Skeleton (sport)
Sledding